HD 160529 (V905 Scorpii) is a luminous blue variable (LBV) star located in the constellation of Scorpius. With an apparent magnitude of around +6.8 cannot be seen with the naked eye except under very favourable conditions, but it is easy to see with binoculars or amateur telescopes.

Physical characteristics 

V905 Sco has a peculiar variable spectral type with emission lines and P Cygni profiles. At visual maximum it is similar to an A9 star and at minimum close to B8.  The distance has been estimated at 2.5 kiloparsecs (8,200 light years) based on the assumption of an absolute magnitude of -8.9. However this distance is uncertain and values between 1.9 kiloparsecs and 3.5 kiloparsecs have been proposed. 

The temperature also varies, from 8,000K in outburst to 12,000K when quiescent.

References 

A-type hypergiants
Luminous blue variables
Scorpius (constellation)
160529
Scorpii, V905
086624
Durchmusterung objects